Ross Ian Thomas McGowan (born 23 April 1982) is an English professional golfer. He has won twice on the European Tour, the 2009 Madrid Masters and the 2020 Italian Open.

Early life and amateur career
McGowan was born in Basildon, Essex, and grew up in Banstead, Surrey and educated at Epsom College. With the assistance of College Prospects of America, he went to university in the United States and played collegiate golf at the University of Tennessee. McGowan won the 2006 English Amateur, where he defeated Oliver Fisher in the final by the score of 5&4. Shortly after that he turned professional.

Professional career
McGowan led the 2007 Challenge Tour Rankings going into the Apulia San Domenico Grand Final, thanks to two wins and three runner-up finishes during the year. Having finished in a tie for 28th place in the final event of the season, he dropped to second place on the money list, as Mike Lorenzo-Vera won the tournament and jumped to the top of the Challenge Tour's money list.

Courtesy of his final Challenge Tour Rankings position in 2007, McGowan graduated to the European Tour for the 2008 season. He moved into the top 100 of the Official World Golf Rankings in January of that year, and in June played in his first major championship, the U.S. Open at Torrey Pines. He made the halfway cut and eventually finished in 77th place.

McGowan won his first European Tour event in 2009 at the Madrid Masters, most notably for shooting 12 under par 60 in the third round. He finished at −25, winning by three strokes over Mikko Ilonen. McGowan finished second at the inaugural Dubai World Championship, and was ranked 12th in the Race to Dubai.

Following this McGowan suffered injuries and his form slumped.  He lost his full playing rights at the end of the 2011 season. From 2012 to 2015 he played on the Challenge Tour and the Sunshine Tour. He showed a return to form in 2015, winning for the first time on the Sunshine Tour in April at the Mopani/Redpath Zambia Open, finishing two strokes ahead South African golfer Daniel van Tonder. In May he was runner-up in the D+D Real Czech Challenge, a stroke behind Jens Fahrbring. At the end of the year he finished tied for 4th in the 2015 European Tour Qualifying School final stage at PGA Catalunya Resort to regain his European Tour card for 2016.

In 2016, McGowan made 6 cuts from 18 events and lost his place on the European Tour. At the end of 2017, he again gained a place on the European Tour through the European Tour Qualifying School. 2018 was another disappointing season on the main tour and he returned to the Challenge Tour for 2019. In May 2019, he won the D+D Real Czech Challenge, his first win on the Challenge Tour since 2007.

As a Challenge Tour winner in 2019, McGowan was able to get an entry to a number of European Tour events in 2020. In October, he won the Italian Open by one shot over Laurie Canter and Nicolas Colsaerts. It was his first European Tour victory in over 11 years.

Amateur wins
2006 English Amateur

Professional wins (8)

European Tour wins (2)

Sunshine Tour wins (1)

Sunshine Tour playoff record (0–1)

Challenge Tour wins (3)

Challenge Tour playoff record (1–1)

MENA Tour wins (2)

Results in major championships

Note: McGowan never played in the Masters Tournament.

CUT = missed the half-way cut
"T" = tied

Results in World Golf Championships

QF, R16, R32, R64 = Round in which player lost in match play
"T" = Tied

Team appearances
Amateur
Eisenhower Trophy (representing England): 2006
St Andrews Trophy (representing Great Britain & Ireland): 2006 (winners)

See also
2007 Challenge Tour graduates
2015 European Tour Qualifying School graduates
2017 European Tour Qualifying School graduates

References

External links

Ross McGowan at the University of Tennessee Athletics official site

English male golfers
Tennessee Volunteers men's golfers
European Tour golfers
Sunshine Tour golfers
Sportspeople from Basildon
People from Banstead
People educated at Epsom College
1982 births
Living people